Aan Milo Sajna is a 1970 Hindi-language musical drama film  written by Sachin Bhowmick, produced by Jagdish Kumar and directed by Mukul Dutt. The film stars Rajesh Khanna and Asha Parekh in the lead roles and the supporting cast included Vinod Khanna, Rajendra Nath and Nirupa Roy. The music is by Laxmikant Pyarelal with lyrics by Anand Bakshi. The film became a super hit at the box office and the song "Acha to Hum Chalte Hain" was a phenomenon. This film is counted among the 17 consecutive hit films of Rajesh Khanna between 1969 and 1971, by adding the two-hero films Marayada and Andaz to the 15 consecutive solo hits he gave from 1969 to 1971. During the interval of other films released in 1970, when the trailer for Aan Milo Sajna, used to be played, crowds would erupt as soon as Rajesh Khanna arrived on the screen.

Plot summary 
Widowed and ailing Savitri Choudhury lives a wealthy lifestyle along with her son, Anil, in a palatial mansion in India. She knows that Anil is only waiting for her to die so that he can inherit the wealth and refuses to give him any money. The Diwan convinces Anil to mend his ways, get married, and patch-up with his mom. Shortly thereafter, Anil does appear to have mended his ways, gets involved in charity, and even introduces a young woman named Deepali to his mom. Deepali moves into the mansion and looks after Savitri so much so that Savitri decides to make her the sole beneficiary of her estate. What Savitri does not know is that Anil has hired Deepali to act as his fiancée, and that Deepali herself is not who she claims to be, and is actually in love with a local horse-riding peasant, Ajit, whose father was convicted of killing Savitri's husband, and soon Ajit himself will be arrested by the police for having an affair with and then killing a woman named Sita.

Cast 

 Rajesh Khanna – Ajit
 Asha Parekh – Varsha / Deepali
 Vinod Khanna – Anil Choudhary
 Nirupa Roy – Savitri Choudhary (Mother of Vinod Khanna)
 Rajendra Nath – Muft Ram Mauji
 Mehmood Junior – Chicoo
Aruna Irani-Deepali, Varsha's Friend
 Tarun Bose – Judge (Varsha's Father)
 Sujit Kumar – Mohan
 Abhi Bhattacharya – Ramesh Babu (Ajit's father)
 Indrani Mukherjee – Seeta (Wife of Sujit Kumar)
 Dulari – Kaushalya Devi(Ajit's mother)
 Chaman Puri – Diwan Ji
 Birbal – Goverdhan
Shivraj – Father of Sujit Kumar
Sunder (actor) – Maghnga Ram

Soundtrack 
The musical score for the film was composed by Laxmikant–Pyarelal and the lyrics were written by Anand Bakshi.

References

External links 
 
 Aan Milo Sajna  Full movie YouTube

1970 films
1970s Hindi-language films
1970 drama films
Indian drama films
Films scored by Laxmikant–Pyarelal
Hindi-language drama films